Jafarguliyev is an Azerbaijani surname. Notable people with the surname include:

Emin Jafarguliyev (born 1990), Azerbaijani footballer
Elvin Jafarguliyev (born 2000), Azerbaijani footballer

See also
 Jafargulu

Azerbaijani-language surnames